Jalal Merhi is a Brazilian-born Canadian action film producer and martial artist. He was born in Brazil to Lebanese immigrant parents.

Career 

He started his film career by selling his jewellery business to start a film production company. He has produced and acted in numerous action films that can be considered martial arts B movies. Because of this he is known as "Beirut’s Steven Seagal."
Merhi first studied Shotokan style of karate as youth later moving to tiger style Kung fu. He has sifu rank in kung fu and owns his own school in Canada.

Filmography
2015 Jalal Merhi: The Man, The Myth, The VCR
2011 The Conspiracy Show Airing 31 Episodes VisionTV
2010 Alexander The Great Of Macedonia In postproduction - Feature film
2009 Soccer Dreams (TV show) 13 Episodes Twentieth Century FOX- Sun TV
2009 Circuit 3 Feature Film
2008 Risk Factor Amsell Ent.
2002 Circuit 2 Blockbusters, Amsell Ent - ThinkFilm
2001 The Circuit Blockbusters, Amsell Ent.- ThinkFilm
2000 Sometimes A Hero Thinkfilm, Amsell ENT
2000 Guaranteed On Delivery Thinkfilm, Amsell ENT.
1999 Tiger Claws III ShowTime, TMN, Amsell ENT
1998 Love Letters Alliance, Amsell ENT
1998 Severe Lions Gate, Amsell ENT.
1997 Crisis Lions Gate, Amsell Ent.
1998 The Cellar (Short) Film One
1997 Variety Amsell ENT. Film One
1997 Tiger Claws II
1995 Sudden Death LionsGate, Cineplex
1997 Expect To Die Lions Gate, Alliance
1995 Death Junction CFP, Film One, SGE
1995 21st Century Man TV Pilot
1995 Expect No Mercy Alliance, Warner Vision
1994 Operation Golden Phoenix Universal Alliance
1993 TC 2000 Universal, Cineplex, SGE
1992 Talons of the Eagle Universal, Cineplex, SGE
1992 Tiger Claws Universal, Cineplex, SGE
1991 Fearless Tiger Cineplex, Imperial

References

External links
 
 Film One (production company)

Living people
Brazilian people of Lebanese descent
Canadian people of Lebanese descent
Canadian film producers
Brazilian emigrants to Canada
1967 births